Kaverin is surname of:

 Veniamin Kaverin, né Zil'ber (1902, Pskov – 1989), Soviet writer
 Vitaliy Kaverin (born 1990), Ukrainian footballer

See also 
 1976 Kaverin, a main-belt asteroid

Russian-language surnames